The men's team pursuit event in cycling at the 1996 Summer Olympics competition consisted of matches between two teams of four cyclists.  The teams started at opposite ends of the track. They had 16 laps (4 kilometres) in which to catch the other cyclist. If neither was caught before one had gone 16 laps, the times for the distance (based on the third rider of the team to cross the line) were used to determine the victor.

Medalists

Results
 Q denotes qualification by place in heat.
 q denotes qualification by overall place.
 DNS denotes did not start.
 DNF denotes did not finish.
 DQ denotes disqualification.
 NR denotes national record.
 OR denotes Olympic record.
 WR denotes world record.
 PB denotes personal best.
 SB denotes season best.

Qualifying round
For the qualifying round, teams did not face each other.  Instead, they raced the 4000 metres by themselves.  The top eight times qualified for the first competition round, with the other nine teams receiving a rank based on their time in this round.

Match round- Quarter Finals
In the first round of match competition, teams were seeded into matches based on their times from the qualifying round. The fastest team faced the eighth-fastest, the second-fastest faced the third, and so forth. Winners advanced to the finals while losers in each match received a final ranking based on their time in the round.

Heat 1

Heat 2

Heat 3

Heat 4

Match round- Semi-Finals

Winners advanced to the medal round while losers in each match received a final ranking based on their time in the round.

Heat 1

Heat 2

Medal round
The third fastest team from the semi-finals received the bronze medal. The fastest two teams competed for the gold and silver medals.

Gold medal match

Final classification
The final classification was:

References

External links
Official Olympic Report

Cycling at the 1996 Summer Olympics
Cycling at the Summer Olympics – Men's team pursuit
Track cycling at the 1996 Summer Olympics
Men's events at the 1996 Summer Olympics